Mogens Sørensen (22 January 1930 – 15 January 2006) was a Danish rower. He competed in two events at the 1956 Summer Olympics.

References

1930 births
2006 deaths
Danish male rowers
Olympic rowers of Denmark
Rowers at the 1956 Summer Olympics
Rowers from Copenhagen